Prince Tadeusz Franciszek Andrzej Ogiński was a szlachcic from the Polish–Lithuanian Commonwealth.

He was Grand Clerk of Lithuania starting in 1737, castellan of Trakai starting in 1744, voivode of Trakai starting in 1770, starost oszmiański, wierzbowski and przewalski.

He had two wives, Izabella Radziwiłł and Jadwiga Załuska.  He had two children with Radziwiłł, Andrzej Ignacy Ogiński and Franciszek Ksawery Ogiński.

Marshal of the Sejm (zwyczajnego) on 5 October - 19 November 1744 in Hrodna.

Knight of the Order of the White Eagle, awarded on 3 August 1742. 

1712 births
1783 deaths
Tadeusz
Voivodes of Trakai